Siti Nurhaliza Collections Sdn. Bhd. is one of the four subsidiary companies under Siti Nurhaliza Productions. The other three is Siti Nurhaliza Marketing, SN Mobile Digital and Siti Sounds. The company serves as to promote Siti Nurhaliza collections (mostly merchandises) as well as her previous albums. Both can be purchased by fans through the company's website.

See also
 Siti Nurhaliza

External links
Siti Nurhaliza's Official Site
Siti Nurhaliza Collections

2002 establishments in Malaysia
Privately held companies of Malaysia
Siti Nurhaliza